Alexei Yurievich Nemov (born 28 May 1976 in Barashevo, Mordovia) is a former artistic gymnast from Russia. During his career, he won five world championships, three European championships and twelve Olympic medals.

Early life
Alexei Nemov grew up in Tolyatti on the Volga River. His father left him and his mother when Nemov was just a baby, and Nemov has never seen him since. Alexei started gymnastics at age five.

Gymnastics career
Nemov made his debut at the 1993 World Championships at the age of sixteen, placing fifth in the floor event. The following year, he stamped himself as a true all-around contender, winning his qualifying session at the Worlds. He later faltered and dropped to twelfth overall. He won his first major all-around title at the Goodwill Games in Saint-Petersburg, beating his second-place teammate and World Silver Medalist Aleksei Voropaev by over one point. Nemov's style of gymnastics was considered very well-rounded; he had complex acrobatics, a unique style, and elegance when he performed.

Despite his initial promising success internationally, by 1995 Nemov had gained a reputation for having inconsistent performances. In the all-around at the 1995 European Cup, Nemov, then 19, was the leader after five events and had put up the high score on three events. When he came to high bar, he only needed an 8.75 to win the title. He missed his two major release moves and crashed into the bar on another, botched a required element, and stopped in the middle of his routine. He scored a 7.35 and dropped to ninth overall.

A few months later, Nemov competed in the World Championships in Sabae, Japan. The Russian team had an extremely poor showing during the qualifying round, finishing in 11th place, with Nemov in 96th position all-around. The team rebounded in the finals to finish 4th overall (still a disappointment since it marked the first time in decades that the Russians failed to medal in the team competition), while Nemov put up the highest optional score of all the competitors. His compulsory round ranking prevented him from qualifying to the all-around finals, however.

At the 1996 Olympics in Atlanta, Nemov seemed poised to win the gold. Nemov won six medals (two gold, one silver, and three bronze). He performed solidly in the all-around, battling World Champion Li Xiaoshuang every step of the way. Nemov ruined his chances for gold, however, when he botched his middle tumbling run in the final event, finishing second by a narrow margin.

While many questioned Nemov's dedication and fitness level, he continued to excel. Several shoulder injuries, as well as his marriage and the birth of his first son, along with perceived inconsistencies in character were cited as evidence of weak gymnastics prior to the 2000 Sydney Olympics. This led to increased concerns about Aleksei's lack of a major title. However, as a high-performance athlete, Nemov went into the 2000 Olympics in the best shape of his life – having never seen his newborn son (born in September 2000), and was able to take home to his son what he called a golden rattle, in reality an all-around gold medal. Except for still rings, he had won at least one Olympic medal in every other discipline of men's gymnastics by the end of the Sydney games.

2004 Olympics controversy and rule change
Although injury took its toll, Nemov competed through to the 2004 Athens Olympics, mainly as an anchor for the fledgling Russian team. Though unable to defend his all-around title, Nemov's performances brought the house down on high bar in Athens and placed him in the middle of a judging controversy. After performing a routine with six release skills in the high bar event final (including four in a row – three variations of Tkatchev releases and a Gienger), the judges posted a score of 9.725, placing him in third position with several athletes still to compete. This was actually a fair judging decision because he took a big step on landing which was a two tenths deduction. The crowd became unruly on seeing the results and interrupted the competition for almost fifteen minutes. Influenced by the crowd's fierce reaction, the judges reevaluated the routine and increased Nemov's score to 9.762, but this did not improve his placement and he finished without a medal.

This scandal was just the latest of several judging disputes in the competition, such as the scoring controversy involving Korean gymnast Yang Tae-Young, and prompted a major reconstruction of the gymnastics scoring system, which was implemented in 2006. The rule changes are credited as having encouraged more acrobatic activity and increasing difficulties on the high bar apparatus seen in later competitions. The Russian Olympic Committee later awarded Nemov $40,000 in recognition of his character, and he retired from gymnastics soon after.

Personal life
Nemov currently lives in his hometown of Tolyatti with his wife Galina and his son Alexei (born 2000) and his other son Dima (born 2009).

In 2022, after the International Gymnastics Federation opened a disciplinary case against Ivan Kuliak for wearing the military symbol "Z" (used by Russian invading forces in Ukraine) at an international gymnastics medal ceremony, Nemov expressed support for him, saying that Kuliak had been "provoked" and that his actions showed "courage".

See also
 List of multiple Olympic gold medalists
 List of multiple Olympic medalists
 List of multiple Summer Olympic medalists
 List of multiple Olympic medalists at a single Games
 List of Olympic medal leaders in men's gymnastics
 List of Olympic male artistic gymnasts for Russia

References

 Russian Olympic Committee will award gymnast Alexei Nemov for performance in Athens Olympics from newsfromrussia.com
 List of competitive results at Gymn Forum
 Alexey Nemov entered the top ten athletes of modern Russia

External links
 
 
 

1976 births
Living people
People from Mordovia
Russian male artistic gymnasts
Gymnasts at the 1996 Summer Olympics
Gymnasts at the 2000 Summer Olympics
Gymnasts at the 2004 Summer Olympics
Olympic gymnasts of Russia
Olympic gold medalists for Russia
Olympic silver medalists for Russia
Olympic bronze medalists for Russia
World champion gymnasts
Medalists at the World Artistic Gymnastics Championships
Olympic medalists in gymnastics
Medalists at the 2000 Summer Olympics
Medalists at the 1996 Summer Olympics
Competitors at the 1994 Goodwill Games
European champions in gymnastics
Sportspeople from Mordovia